Federal Route 190, consisting of Jalan Kota Raja, Jalan Sungai Kandis and Jalan Bukit Kemuning (formerly Selangor state route B3 and B12), is a federal road in Klang Valley region, Selangor, Malaysia. It is also a main route to Klang from Puchong, Kota Kemuning and Bukit Rimau.

The Kilometre Zero of the Federal Route 190 starts at Klang Town Centre.

Features
At most sections, the Federal Route 190 was built under the JKR R5 road standard, allowing maximum speed limit of up to 90 km/h.

List of junctions

References

Malaysian Federal Roads